Zuko is a given name and surname. Notable people with the name include:

People
Zuko Džumhur (1920–1989), Bosnian writer, painter and caricaturist

Fictional characters
Zuko, major character in Avatar: The Last Airbender
Danny Zuko, character in the musical and film Grease

See also
 Zucco (disambiguation)
 Zuco 103, Dutch musical ensemble which plays music in the style of Brazil
 Zuke (disambiguation)